Mohammadreza Mansouri (born 23 April 1978) is an Iranian football referee.

Career

Mansouri became a FIFA referee in 2012 when he officiated in the top league in Iran. Mansouri also assistant-refereed the AFC Champions League, beginning in 2012.

Mansouri was the assistant referee in the 2015 FIFA Club World Cup Final between Club Atlético River Plate and FC Barcelona. He was the assistant referee in the 2016 Indian Super League Final between Kerala Blasters and ATK, as well as in the 2016 Olympic football final match between Brazil and Denmark.

Mansouri was assistant referee in six matches of the 2017 Liga 1 in Indonesia and two matches of the 2017 FIFA Confederations Cup in Russia.

Mansouri was assistant referee in 4 matches of the 2018 FIFA World Cup in Russia. Perhaps the most important match in which he was the assistant referee was the third place match between England and Belgium.  

He was also referee of the second leg of the 2018 AFF Championship Final between Vietnam and Malaysia.

Mansouri was assistant referee in two matches of the 2019 Asian cup in the United Arab Emirates. He will return as an assistant referee for the 2022 FIFA World Cup in Qatar.

Matches

FIFA World Cup

FIFA Confederations Cup

Summer Olympic

AFC Asian Cup

FIFA Club World Cup

1978 births
Living people
Iranian football referees